Eric Alan "Rick" Crawford (born January 22, 1966) is an American politician who has been the U.S. representative for  since 2011. He is a member of the Republican Party. Before he was elected to Congress, Crawford was a radio announcer, businessman, and U.S. Army soldier.

Early life and education
Crawford was born at Homestead Air Force Base in Florida, the son of Ruth Anne and Donnie J. "Don" Crawford. He grew up in a military family; his father served in the United States Air Force. He graduated from Alvirne High School in Hudson, New Hampshire. Crawford enlisted in the United States Army and served as an explosive ordnance disposal technician assigned to the 56th Ordnance Detachment at Fort Indiantown Gap in Pennsylvania. He left the U.S. Army after four years' service at the rank of Sergeant. After his service, Crawford attended Arkansas State University in Jonesboro, Arkansas, graduating in 1996 with a B.S. in agriculture business and economics.

Rodeo and music career 
In 1993, Crawford was seriously injured in a rodeo accident. He transitioned into a career in radio announcing for the rodeo. He also launched a music career, and has been called a "singing cowboy" as he sometimes performed his music while riding a horse. In 1994, Legacy, Inc. released his album Crackin' Out, recorded at Haage Studios in Kirbyville, Missouri. Crawford dedicated the project to "that dyin' breed called 'Cowboy'".

Radio career 
Crawford was a news anchor and agri-reporter on KAIT-TV in Jonesboro and farm director on KFIN-FM. He owned and operated the AgWatch Network, a farm news network heard on 39 radio stations in Arkansas, Missouri, Tennessee, Mississippi, and Kentucky.

U.S. House of Representatives

Elections

2010 

Crawford ran for Arkansas's 1st congressional district after U.S. Representative Marion Berry decided to retire. He was endorsed by Governor Tim Pawlenty of Minnesota, former Arkansas Governor Mike Huckabee, former federal official Asa Hutchinson, and former U.S. Representative Ed Bethune. He won the Republican primary, defeating Princella Smith, 72% to 28%, and the general election, defeating Berry's chief of staff Chad Causey, 52% to 43%.

2012 

Crawford was reelected, defeating Democratic nominee Scott Ellington, 56% to 39%.

2014 

Crawford was reelected to a third term, defeating Heber Springs Mayor Jackie McPherson, 63% to 33%.

2016 

Crawford was reelected to a fourth term, defeating Libertarian candidate Mark West, 76% to 24%.

2018 

Crawford was reelected to a fifth term, defeating Democratic nominee Chinton Desai, 70% to 29%.

2020 

Crawford was reelected unopposed.

2022 

Crawford was reelected to a seventh term, defeating the Democratic nominee, Arkansas State Representative Monte Hodges, 75% to 25%.

Tenure
On January 5, 2011, Crawford was sworn into office as a member of the 112th Congress. He is the first Republican to represent his district since Reconstruction. The last Republican to represent the district was Asa Hodges, who vacated the seat on March 3, 1875. Crawford is a member of the Republican Study Committee.

In 2010, Crawford signed a pledge sponsored by Americans for Prosperity to vote against any global warming legislation that would raise taxes.

Crawford supported President Donald Trump's 2017 executive order to impose a ban on travel to the U.S. by citizens of seven Muslim-majority countries, saying that the order was "designed to keep our nation safer" but that "Green card holders and aides of the U.S. military should be allowed entry."

Crawford voted for the Tax Cuts and Jobs Act of 2017. He believed the bill would make it easier for people to file their taxes and that "the vast majority of middle-income families in my district will get to keep more of their money to use as they wish." He also believed that local businesses would hire more and raise employees' pay in the wake of the bill's implementation.

In 2019, Crawford received a death threat from James Powell, a 43-year-old Arkansas resident. Powell was charged with "first-degree terroristic threatening" after an investigation by U.S. Capitol Police and the FBI. The charge carries a maximum six-year prison sentence and $10,000 fine.

Crawford opposed Obergefell v. Hodges, the Supreme Court ruling that same-sex marriage bans are unconstitutional.

In December 2020, Crawford was one of 126 Republican members of the House of Representatives to sign an amicus brief in support of Texas v. Pennsylvania, a lawsuit filed at the United States Supreme Court contesting the results of the 2020 presidential election, in which Joe Biden defeated Trump. The Supreme Court declined to hear the case on the basis that Texas lacked standing under Article III of the Constitution to challenge the results of an election held by another state.

As of October 2021, Crawford had voted in line with Joe Biden's stated position 7.5% of the time.

Legislation
On January 18, 2013, Crawford introduced the Farmers Undertake Environmental Land Stewardship Act (H.R. 311; 113th Congress). The bill would require the Environmental Protection Agency (EPA) to modify the Spill Prevention, Control, and Countermeasure (SPCC) rule, which regulates oil discharges into navigable waters and adjoining shorelines. The rule requires certain farmers to develop an oil spill prevention plan certified by a professional engineer and may require them to make infrastructure changes. According to supporters, the bill would "ease the burden placed on farmers and ranchers" by making it easier for smaller farms to self-certify and raising the level of storage capacity under which farms are exempted.

Committee assignments

 Committee on Agriculture
 Subcommittee on Department Operations, Oversight, and Credit
 Subcommittee on General Farm Commodities and Risk Management
 Subcommittee on Nutrition and Horticulture
 Committee on Transportation and Infrastructure
 Subcommittee on Economic Development, Public Buildings and Emergency Management
 Subcommittee on Highways and Transit
 Subcommittee on Water Resources and Environment
 Republican Study Committee

Temporary resignation
On November 8, 2019, Crawford announced he would temporarily resign from his seat on the House Intelligence Committee. Taking his place was Jim Jordan. This move allowed Jordan to lead President Donald Trump's public impeachment hearings. Crawford said he would resume his position once the "impeachment hoax" had concluded.

Electoral history

Personal life

Crawford and his wife, Stacy, live in Jonesboro with their children. He attends Central Baptist Church, a Southern Baptist congregation in Jonesboro.

References

External links

 Congressman Rick Crawford official U.S. House website
 Rick Crawford for Congress
 
 
 

|-

1966 births
21st-century Baptists
21st-century American politicians
American male journalists
American radio reporters and correspondents
Arkansas State University alumni
Baptists from Arkansas
Baptists from the United States
Bomb disposal personnel
Living people
Military personnel from New Hampshire
People from Arkansas
People from Craighead County, Arkansas
People from Jonesboro, Arkansas
Politicians from Craighead County, Arkansas
Politicians from Jonesboro, Arkansas
Protestants from Arkansas
Republican Party members of the United States House of Representatives from Arkansas
Southern Baptists
United States Army soldiers